The indoor men's singles was one of six lawn tennis events on the Tennis at the 1908 Summer Olympics programme. Nations could enter up to 12 players.

Draw

Draw

There was no match for third place.  Eaves, described in the Official Report as "obviously out of condition", had not finished his semifinal match after a tight first set played in great heat. Ritchie, therefore, was awarded the bronze medal.

Notes

External links
 
  ITF, 2008 Olympic Tennis Event Media Guide

Men's indoor singles
Men's events at the 1908 Summer Olympics